The Victoria Derby is Australia's oldest classic harness race, dating back to 1914 when it was contested on the old Richmond circuit.

Winners
Past winners of the Victoria Derby are:
   2022    Leap To Fame
   2021    Act Now
   2020    Line Up
   2019    Muscle Factory
   2018    Colt Thirty One
   2017    Our Little General
   2016    Lazarus
   2015    Menin Gate
   2014    Our Maxim
   2013    Ohoka Punter
	2012	Scandalman
	2011	Sushi Sushi 
	2010	Courage To Rule
	2009	Captain Joy
	2008	Tanabi Bromac
	2007	Lombo Pocket Watch
	2006	Divisive
	2005	Emmas Only
	2004	The Sentry
	2003	Bellas Boy
	2002	Tricky Vic
	2001	Rare Gem
	2000	Stars And Stripes
	1999	Courage Under Fire
	1998	Holmes D G
	1997	Lavros Star
	1996	Sharp And Telford
	1995	Blueagle
	1994	Khans Thunder
	1993	Golden Reign
	1992	Lotsnlots
	1991	Dark Paul
	1990	Admiral Holliday
	1989	Westburn Grant
	1988	Another Bart
	1987	Sir Lorian
	1986	Smooth Falcon
	1985	Bag Limit
	1984	Area Code
	1983	Man Of The Moment
	1982	Garry's Advice
	1981	Gundary Flyer
	1980	Under A Cloud
	1979	Rhett
	1978	Brad Adios
	1977	Sammy Karamea
	1976	High Advice
	1975	Little William
	1974	Alphalite
	1973	Paleface Adios
	1972	Annastere
	1971	Moon Reveller
	1970	Welcome Advice
	1969	National Gold
	1968	Ascot King
	1967	Kelly Kid
	1966	Future Intangible
	1965	Bon Adios
	1964	Dale's Gift
	1963	Tactile
	1962	Future Raider
	1961	Opal Chief
	1960	Arabian
	1959	Meadow Royal
	1958	Smoko
	1957	Shean Truis
	1956	Argent
	1955	Mighty Warrior
	1954	Mineral Spring
	1953	Rotarian
	1952	Selwyn
	1951	High Raider
	1950	Acclaim
	1949	Lawrenny
	1948	General Dixie
	1941	Bobby Linden
	1940	Admirer
	1939	Radiant Robert
	1938	Radiant Walla
	1937	The Gap
	1936	Gentle Bobbie
	1935	Dixie Globe
	1934	Grand Harold
	1933	Star Princess
	1932	Connie Glo
	1931	Con Derby
	1930	Jean Pronto
	1929	My Chum
	1928	Robert Derby
	1927	Lulureen
	1926	Wilverley
	1925	Torpedo Huon
	1924	Auto Machine
	1923	Vinmont Chimes
	1917-22 No race held
	1916	Princess Chimes
	1915	Countess Chimes
	1914	Lucap

See also
 Harness racing in Australia

References

Harness races in Australia